Ysgol Syr Hugh Owen is a bilingual comprehensive secondary school for pupils aged 11–18. The school is situated in Caernarfon, Gwynedd, Wales. The school was established in 1894, the first to be built under the Welsh Intermediate Education Act 1889, which was heavily influenced by the educator Sir Hugh Owen, after whom the school was named.

As of 2022, there were 937 pupils enrolled at the school. Its current headteacher is Paul Mathews Jones. It serves the town of Caernarfon and the nearby villages, which include; Bontnewydd, Caeathro, Y Felinheli, Llandwrog, Rhosgadfan and Rhostryfan.

Welsh is the school's main language of communication and administration. All subjects, except Welsh and English, are taught to all pupils using both languages. According to the latest Estyn report, 90% of pupils speak Welsh with their families and 92% are fluent in the language. The school claims that 98% of pupils were fluent in Welsh in 2016.

There is also a sixth form, which enables students to stay at the school for a further two years instead of having to transfer to college.

History

Establishment
As an advocate of education reform, Hugh Owen recognised the need for improvements in the schools of Wales. Being both a member of the British and Foreign School Society and the Cambrian Educational Society, Owen enthusiastically supported the idea of non-denominational day schools. During the 1840s he wrote two letters to the people of Wales, acknowledging the need to establish such schools. His efforts were partially successful, as it consequently lead to the creation of a number of schools in the country, but many schools suffered from a lack of qualified teachers. In order to train teachers, Owen saw the need to be a benefactor of more universities, those being Bangor Normal College, Swansea University, and University College of Wales in 1875.

Upon retiring to raise funds for the University College of Wales in Aberystwyth, Owen turned his attention once more to the need of education reform in schools. Owen wanted to qualify students sufficiently to be accepted by the newly established universities. At a lecture at the 1880 National Eisteddfod in Caernarfon, Owen read a paper entitled Intermediate Education in Ireland and Secondary Education in Wales to members of the Cymmrodorion, where he highlighted the need of more intermediate schools. The following year Owen was knighted for his services in education, but died three months after, aged 77.

The paper he read would eventually lead to the passing of the Welsh Intermediate Education Act 1889. The purpose of the act was detailed in clause two, as follows;

The first intermediate school was established in Caernarfon, to serve the whole of Caernarfonshire. Royal assent was given in 1893 and the school opened in February 1894. The school was later renamed in Sir Owen's honour, but was at the time known as the Caernarvon County School due to the county-wide provision of the new schools.

Attempt to burn down the school
On 15 August 1914, the County School was a target of a failed attempt to burn the building down. It was suspected that the Suffrage movement was responsible for the attempt, and did the act as a protest.

Notable former pupils

 Guto Bebb – Conservative Member of Parliament for Aberconwy
 Nathan Craig – footballer, Caernarfon Football Club (ex Everton and Wales U21)
 William David Davies – Presbyterian minister and writer on theological topics
 Wyn Davies – former footballer for Bolton, Newcastle Utd., Manchester Utd., Manchester City & Wales
 William Charles Evans – biochemist, Bangor University
 Selwyn Iolen – Welsh language poet
 Grace Wynne Griffith - Folk song collector
 Cai Griffiths – rugby union player
 William John Gruffydd – writer and politician
 Emily Huws – Welsh language children's author
 Jamie Jones – DJ, producer and two time DJ Awards winner
 Hywel Lewis – theologian and philosopher
 Mari Lövgreen – television presenter 
 Ray Mielczarek – footballer
 Bryan Orritt – footballer
 Emrys Roberts (1910–1990) – Liberal politician and businessman
 Kate Roberts – Welsh language author 
 Winston Roddick – barrister and former Police and Crime Commissioner for North Wales Police
 Dafydd Wigley – Plaid Cymru Member of Parliament for Caernarfon (UK Parliament constituency)

References

External links
  

Secondary schools in Gwynedd
1894 establishments in Wales
Educational institutions established in 1894
Caernarfon